Penn Township is one of the fourteen townships of Morgan County, Ohio, United States.  The 2000 census found 777 people in the township.

Geography
Located in the southern part of the county, it borders the following townships:
Malta Township - north
Windsor Township - east
Marion Township - south
Union Township - west

No municipalities are located in Penn Township.

Name and history
Statewide, the only other Penn Township is located in Highland County.

Government
The township is governed by a three-member board of trustees, who are elected in November of odd-numbered years to a four-year term beginning on the following January 1. Two are elected in the year after the presidential election and one is elected in the year before it. There is also an elected township fiscal officer, who serves a four-year term beginning on April 1 of the year after the election, which is held in November of the year before the presidential election. Vacancies in the fiscal officership or on the board of trustees are filled by the remaining trustees.

As of 2007, the trustees are Ray Crouse, Jan Scott, and Richard Welsh, and the clerk is Jamie Downing.

References

External links
County website

Townships in Morgan County, Ohio
Townships in Ohio